Yogesh Patil (born 26 June 1972) is an Indian politician from the Maharashtra state and belongs to the Shiv Sena. He has served from 2004 to 2009 as the Member of legislative assembly (MLA) of Bhiwandi constituency of the state Maharashtra.

Born and raised in Agri(caste) Hindu family, Patil became both a student leader and a skilled kabbadi player. He is an alumnus of Mumbai University, where he was a university representative and a student leader.

References

Shiv Sena politicians
Maharashtra MLAs 2004–2009
Marathi politicians
People from Bhiwandi
1972 births
Living people